Myriotrema muluense is a species of corticolous (bark-dwelling) lichen in the family Graphidaceae. Found in Malaysia, it was formally described as a new species in 2002 by lichenologists Natsurang Homchantara and Brian J. Coppins. It specific epithet refers to the type locality, the only location the species is known to occur. The lichen has a smooth and shiny, grey olivaceous thallus with a thick cortex and a white medulla. It does not contain any lichen substances.

References

muluense
Lichen species
Lichens described in 2002
Lichens of Malaysia
Taxa named by Brian John Coppins
Taxa named by Natsurang Homchantara